Gymnocrex is a genus of bird in the rail family, Rallidae.

It contains the following species:
 Bare-eyed rail, Gymnocrex plumbeiventris
 Blue-faced rail or bald-faced rail, Gymnocrex rosenbergii
 Talaud rail, Gymnocrex talaudensis

 
Rallidae
Bird genera
Taxonomy articles created by Polbot